Agios Ioannis (also Άγιος Ιωάννης Λετρίνων - Agios Ioannis Letrinon) is a settlement and community in the municipality of Pyrgos, Elis, Peloponnese, Greece. It was an independent community between 1912 and 1997. The name translates as "Saint John".

See also
List of settlements in Elis

External links
 Page of Agios Ioannis, Elis

References

Populated places in Elis